The South Indians' Welfare Society (SIWS) was founded in 1934 with an objective to provide educational facilities to the local population. Initially, the society started a primary school at Shivaji Park, Dadar in 1934 and another at Matunga in 1936. SIWS is a combination of N.R. Swamy College of Commerce and Economics and Smt. Thirumalai College of Science. Later, a high school was started to meet the growing needs of its own students of the primary schools with the first batch passing the S.S.C Examination in 1947. Presently the primary and secondary schools of the Society instruct 4,000 students. In 1976, a Junior College of the Commerce Stream was begun with the goal of providing higher education to a section of its own students. This was followed by the opening of a Degree College in Commerce and Economics in June 1980.
The college motto is to provide an excellent learning atmosphere to brighten up the student's career and mold them to become able citizens of the country.

The junior and degree classes are conducted in their own building equipped with facilities. In April 1983, the first students appeared for their T.Y.B.Com. Degree Examination of the Mumbai University. In the year 1988-89, the Society started the Junior College in Science attached to the Degree College with well-equipped laboratories. This was soon followed by the Degree College of Science affiliated to the University of Bombay from June 1990 and thus came the Smt. Thirumalai College of Sciences. The first batch of Students appeared for TYBSc in April 1993.

Courses
It has been established with the sole objective of promoting cultural, educational and professional excellence among the younger generations. The college today has grown as an institution of the mark by offering a wide range of courses viz., B.Com, B.Sc, M.Com, and M.Sc. In the year 2000, the institution crossed a milestone when it started specialized professional courses, in the field of Management (BBI & BMS). 
 Junior College of Science and Commerce.
B.com, Bsc.information technology (IT), Bsc.computer science(Cs), Bsc. Chemistry, BSc.Physics, BSc. Microbiology, BMS, B. Com (Banking and Insurance)
M.Com, M.Sc. Chemistry (By Research), M.Sc. (IT),M.Sc. (CS)

References

Universities and colleges in Mumbai
Colleges in India